The Union of Azerbaijani Writers is the largest public organization of Azerbaijani writers, poets and publicists. It has over 1500 members at present. It was founded on June 13, 1934, when Azerbaijan was a part of the Soviet Union as the Azerbaijan Soviet Socialist Republic.

History
Prior to 1934, Azerbaijani writers grouped in variety of literary unions. In 1923, a group of writers formed the "İldırım" United Organization of Turkic Publicists and Poets. Later, in 1925, another organization known as "Qızıl qələmlər" (Golden Pens) was established uniting most writers and regularly conducting literary gathering events.
The Union of Azerbaijani Writers was established on June 13, 1934. There were 93 members upon its registration. With its establishment, the organization also started publication of "Ədəbiyyat qəzeti" (Literature) newspaper. To this day, there have been 11 congresses held by the union in 1934, 1954, 1958, 1965, 1971, 1976, 1981, 1986, 1991, 1997 and 2004 which are normally held every 5 years.

Structure
At the present, the Union has regional chapters in Ganja, Karabakh region, Lankaran, Mingachevir, Shaki, Shirvan region, Sumgayit, Guba, Qazakh and representative offices in Moscow (Russia), Borchali, (Georgia), Derbent (Dagestan), Istanbul (Turkey).
The Union of Azerbaijani Writers if a multi-ethnic organization having members who write and publish in Azerbaijani, Russian, Lezgi, Talysh, Tat and other languages.
The organization has a chairman, secretary and a board of directors who manage its activities. It is currently chaired by Anar (son of writer Rasul Reza) and its secretary is Chingiz Abdullayev.

Chairmen

References

External links
 

Azerbaijani writers' organizations
Cultural organizations based in Azerbaijan
Azerbaijani literature